Harmonic mixing or key mixing (also referred to as mixing in key) is a DJ's continuous mix between two pre-recorded tracks that are most often either in the same key, or their keys are relative or in a subdominant or dominant relationship with one another.

The primary goal of harmonic mixing is to create a smooth transition between songs. Songs in the same key do not generate a dissonant tone when mixed. This technique enables DJs to create a harmonious and consonant mashup with any music genre.

Traditional methods
A commonly known method of using harmonic mixing is to detect the root key of every music file in the DJ collection by using a piano. The root key that fits the track perfectly may be used to create harmonic mash-ups with other tracks in the same key. The root key is also considered compatible with the subdominant, dominant and relative major/minor keys.

See also
Beatmatching
Segue in music

References 

DJing
Audio mixing